Expeditie Robinson 2018 was the first season of the Belgian version of Swedish television series Expedition Robinson since the Belgian's exit from the co-production with the Dutch in 2012. In this season, seventeen Belgians compete in two tribes of eight where they compete for 33 days to see who will become Robinson 2018 and win €25,000. After 33 days, Robbe De Backer became the winner of Robinson 2018 after winning against Nele Velghe in a 6-1 jury vote. The season premiered on 6 September 2018.

Finishing order

References

External links

Expeditie Robinson seasons
2018 in Belgian television
Belgian reality television series